Play It Loud! Festival was a heavy metal festival held annually in Orzinuovi, Italy since 2007. It is organized by the My Graveyard Productions independent record label. The festival has up-and-coming bands from Italy and Europe (which usually occupy the first few performing slots), re-united Italian metal acts from the 80s (which perform during late afternoon and early evening) and old-school international metal acts from the past (which usually close the day as headliners). The first edition featured NWOBHM (New Wave of British Heavy Metal) legends Blitzkrieg and Raven, while the second hosted the likes of Elixir, Cloven Hoof, Helstar and Manilla Road. The third edition of the festival took place on February, 2009, and it will be co-headlined by Exciter and Jag Panzer.

Lineups

2009

Held at Argelato near Bologna

Exciter
Jag Panzer
Jaguar
Vanexa
Bud Tribe
Lonewolf
National Suicide
Fallen Fuckin' Angels
Wotan

2008
Held at Buddha Café in Orzinuovi, Italy on February 23.
Manilla Road
Helstar
Cloven Hoof
Steel Assassin
Sabotage
Elixir
Adramelch
Tarchon Fist
Frozen Tears
Alltheniko
Berserker

2007
Held at Buddha Café in Orzinuovi, Italy on February 17.

Raven
Blitzkrieg
Skanners
Paragon
Crying Steel
Dark Quarterer
Ironsword
Battleroar
Assedium
Battle Ram
Powerful

References

External links
Play It Loud! Festival at MySpace

Heavy metal festivals in Italy